Pastaza–Morona–Marañon National Forest in Peru was established by RS Number 442 in 1963 and covers an area of .

The area has no administration and has serious problems. Inside the forest are 6 native communities of Candoshi.

National forests of Peru
Protected areas established in 1963